Leonel Ignacio Álvarez (born 22 March 1995) is an Argentine professional footballer who plays as a midfielder for Nueva Chicago, on loan from Deportivo Armenio.

Career
Álvarez was an unused substitute for Argentine Primera División side Independiente in March 2017 against San Martín, prior to making his senior debut in the Copa Argentina on 17 May versus Atlético Camioneros. On 30 August 2017, Álvarez was loaned out to Primera B Metropolitana's Atlanta. His first appearance for Atlanta was also in the Copa Argentina, as he played the full ninety minutes as the club knocked Primera División team Belgrano out. On 14 October, Álvarez made his professional league debut in a 2–2 draw with Barracas Central. Upon returning to Independiente, he spent the next twelve months with their reserves.

Álvarez's contract with Independiente came to an end in June 2019. In March 2020, Álvarez was announced as a new signing for Liga Dominicana outfit Delfines del Este. He wouldn't appear competitively in the Dominican Republic due to the COVID-19 pandemic. On 28 August 2020, Álvarez returned to Argentina with Deportivo Armenio of Primera B Metropolitana. In January 2022, Álvarez was loaned out to Primera Nacional club Nueva Chicago.

Career statistics
.

Honours
Independiente
Copa Sudamericana: 2017

References

External links

1995 births
Living people
People from Temperley
Argentine footballers
Association football midfielders
Argentine expatriate footballers
Expatriate footballers in the Dominican Republic
Argentine expatriate sportspeople in the Dominican Republic
Argentine Primera División players
Primera B Metropolitana players
Club Atlético Independiente footballers
Club Atlético Atlanta footballers
Delfines del Este FC players
Deportivo Armenio footballers
Nueva Chicago footballers
Sportspeople from Buenos Aires Province